3Girls, also known as 3G or Ghost, Giant and Girl, is a 2017 Burmese horror film starring A Linn Yaung, Phway Phway, Ei Chaw Po and Paing Phyo Thu. The film produced by Dawei Movie Production premiered in Myanmar on December 15, 2017.

Cast
 A Linn Yaung as Kyi Nyo
 Phway Phway as Khaung Pwint Lwar (Giant)
 Ei Chaw Po as Moe Sat Cho (Ghost)
 Paing Phyo Thu as Shwe Yoke Thwin (Girl)

Awards and nominations

References

External links

2017 films
2010s Burmese-language films
Burmese horror films
Films shot in Myanmar
Films directed by Wyne